The Disruptive Entrepreneur is an interview-style audio podcast focusing on business and entrepreneurship, hosted by Rob Moore. Free weekly episodes of the podcast feature guests from the worlds of business, literature, entertainment, sports, media and culture.

Format 
The Disruptive Entrepreneur is primarily an interview-style dialogue between host Rob Moore and a guest. The interview episodes conclude with a question segment, in which the host asks the guest "What does the word disruptive mean to you?" The podcast also features "Rob's Rant" and "Caffeine Cast" short episodes. Content is uncensored and there are no advertisements.

Episodes 
The podcast is available on iTunes. , there are more than 290 episodes of the show, averaging 10 to 110 minutes in length. There are usually two video and audio episodes per week including interviews with MBEs, celebrities, athletes, and business experts.

Guests 
In the 52nd episode, published July 2016, Kevin Kelly, the founding executive editor of Wired magazine, expressed his views on current and future technology trends, including VR and artificial intelligence. The special 250th episode in April 2018 featured unedited interview with the infamous conspiracy theorist David Icke. Other notable guests include the following:

List of notable guests

Reception 
The podcast has become one of the most popular in the UK business category. In February 2016, eight days after its launch, it entered list of Top 100 podcasts on British iTunes. In 2016, Australian airline Qantas included The Disruptive Entrepreneur podcast, hosted by Omny Studio, as part of its on-demand in-flight entertainment system.

References

External links
 

Audio podcasts
2016 podcast debuts
Video podcasts
Interview podcasts
Business and finance podcasts